JS Unryū (SS-502) is the second boat of Sōryū-class submarines. She was commissioned on 25 March 2010.

Construction and career
Unryū was laid down at Kawasaki Heavy Industries Kobe Shipyard on 31 March 2006 as the 2005 plan 2900-ton submarine No. 8117 based on the medium-term defense capability development plan. At the launching ceremony, it was named Unryū and launched. She's commissioned on 25 March 2010 and deployed to Kure.

On 24 September 2013, she left Kure for Hawaii for training in the United States. I returned to Kure on 24 December.

From 10 to 15 May 2016, joint training such as anti-submarine training was conducted with the Royal Australian Navy submarine HMAS Rankin off the coast of Shikoku.

From 14 October of the same year to 14 January 2017, he participated in the US dispatch training (toward Hawaii).

From 27 August – 28 November 2020, he will participate in US dispatch training (submarines) and conduct offshore training and facility utilization training in the Hawaiian Islands area.

Unryū belongs to the 5th Submarine of the 1st Submarine Group, and its homeport is Kure.

Gallery

Citations

External links

2008 ships
Sōryū-class submarines
Ships built by Kawasaki Heavy Industries